Philippi Glacier may refer to:
 Philippi Glacier, South Georgia
 Philippi Glacier, Antarctica